James Eddie (born 3 June 1985) is a Scottish former professional Rugby union player. He played as a flanker or lock for Glasgow Warriors in the Guinness PRO12.

Eddie has represented both Scotland A and Scotland Sevens and has made 126 appearances for his club since joining as an apprentice in 2004 and earning his professional contract in 2006.

On 26 April 2016 James Eddie announced his retirement from playing professional rugby with immediate effect. A huge fans favourite, Eddie paid tribute to the fans on his retiral: "The Glasgow Warriors supporters have always had my back, they've been amazing and I want to thank them for all the support they've given me." This was echoed by Gregor Townsend:  "James has been a great role model for what the Warriors are all about – working hard every day to improve himself and also doing all he can to get the best out of his teammates. He has also been a great ambassador for the club and is rightly held in high regard from our supporters."

In May 2016 he was named as Specialist Skills Coach for GHA.

Reference List

External links 
 James Eddie Glasgow Warriors biography
 James Eddie ESPN Scrum Player Profile

1985 births
Living people
Rugby union flankers
Scottish rugby union players
Glasgow Warriors players
Rugby union players from Glasgow
Glasgow Hutchesons Aloysians RFC players
Clarkston RFC players
Glasgow Southern players
Scotland international rugby sevens players
Scotland 'A' international rugby union players
Male rugby sevens players